Leucopogon lavarackii  is a species of flowering plant in the heath family Ericaceae and is endemic to Cape York Peninsula in far northern Queensland. It is a much-branched shrub with softly-hairy branchlets, oblong, elliptic or lance-shaped leaves and spikes of white, tube-shaped flowers.

Description
The fruit is an orange-yellow, elliptic drupe about the same length as the sepals.

Taxonomy
Leucopogon lavarackii was first formally described in 1990 by Leslie Pedley in the journal Austrobaileya from specimens collected by Leonard John Brass on Mount Tozer in 1948. The specific epithet (lavarackii) honours Peter S. Lavarack.

Distribution and habitat
This leucopogon grows on sand and shallow, rocky soil on Cape York Peninsula as far south as Cooktown.

References

lavarackii
Ericales of Australia
Flora of Queensland
Plants described in 1990